Poplar River Airport  is located adjacent to Poplar River, Manitoba, Canada.

References

External links

Registered aerodromes in Manitoba